The Four Hills Tournament or the German-Austrian Ski Jumping Week is a ski jumping event composed of four World Cup events and has taken place in Germany and Austria each year since 1953. With few exceptions, it has consisted of the ski jumping events held at Oberstdorf, Garmisch-Partenkirchen, Innsbruck and Bischofshofen, in this order.

The Four Hills Tournament champion is the one who gets the most points over the four events. Unlike the World Cup ranking, however, the actual points scored during the competitions are the ones that are used to determine the winner. In 2005–06, Janne Ahonen and Jakub Janda shared the overall victory after finishing with exactly the same points total after the four competitions. In 2001–02, the anniversary 50th edition, Sven Hannawald was the first to achieve the grand slam of ski jumping, winning all four events in the same edition. In 2017–18 season Kamil Stoch became the second ski jumper in history to obtain this achievement, and just a year later, in the 2018–19 edition, Ryōyū Kobayashi became the third.

The four individual events themselves are part of the World Cup and award points toward the world cup in exactly the same manner as all other world cup events.

Tournament hills 

Traditionally, the order of the tournament competitions has been: Oberstdorf, Garmisch-Partenkirchen, Innsbruck, Bischofshofen – with the following exceptions:
1953: Garmisch-Partenkirchen was the first, and Oberstdorf the second event.
1956–57, 1961–62, 1962–63: Innsbruck was the second event, and Garmisch-Partenkirchen third.
1971–72: Innsbruck was first, and Oberstdorf third.
2007–08, 2021–22: The Innsbruck event was cancelled due to bad weather, and replaced with an additional competition at Bischofshofen.

Knock-out system

One of the tournament's peculiarities is its qualifying system. Unlike other ski jumping events where the best 30 competitors in the first round qualify for the second round, all Four Hills events follow a knock-out system first introduced for the 1996–97 season.

The 50 competitors are divided into 25 pairs. All 25 winners of these duels plus the five best losers qualify for the second round. It is theoretically possible that a competitor who finishes the first round 12th will not qualify for the second round (if he loses his internal duel, five lucky losers and winners of their duels have better results) while the one with the 49th first series result may still qualify (if his "rival" has the worst result). On the other hand, jumpers are less likely to be disadvantaged by a possible significant change in weather conditions between the start and end of the first series. A change in the direction and speed of the wind can make it impossible for the best jumpers to produce a good result. In the event of significantly worse conditions during the second half of the first series, the possibility exists that most of the best jumpers would be eliminated by bad luck alone. Directly pairing rivals reduces the impact of these conditions. In this competition format the qualifying series are valued as well, since jumpers with a better qualification result will have the opportunity to compete against jumpers with worse result. Therefore, it is not enough for a jumper to be among 50 best jumpers in qualifications (with whatever result), but it is better for him to achieve a result as good as possible.

The first jumper in the competition is the one who qualified 26th, followed by his pair who qualified 25th. The next pair has 27th and 24th from the qualification, one after that 28th and 23rd etc. The last pair has last qualified jumper against qualification winner.

If qualification is postponed until the day of competition, the knock-out system is not used, and competition follows regular world cup rules. Because of that in the 2007/08 tournament, the knock-out system was used only in Oberstdorf.

List of winners 

Notes

Records 
Janne Ahonen is the only ski jumper to have won the tournament five times, with wins in 1998–99, 2002–03, 2004–05, 2005–06 and 2007–08. Jens Weißflog was the first ski jumper to reach four wins, winning the tournament in 1984, 1985, 1991 and 1996. Helmut Recknagel, Bjørn Wirkola and Kamil Stoch have the next best record, winning three titles each. Wirkola's victories came in three consecutive years (1967–1969), a record still uncontested.

Janne Ahonen's fourth victory in 2005–06 was also the first time the tournament victory was shared, with Jakub Janda, who claimed his first Four Hills Tournament crown.

Jens Weißflog and Bjørn Wirkola have both won ten Four Hills Tournament events. Janne Ahonen and Gregor Schlierenzauer are next with nine victories, followed by Ryōyū Kobayashi with eight.

In 2000–01, the 49th edition of the tournament, Adam Małysz beat second placed Janne Ahonen by 104.4 points. This is the biggest winning margin in the tournament's history. He also won all four qualifications that year. The following year Sven Hannawald became the first person to win all four competitions in a single season. In 2017-18 Kamil Stoch has repeated Hannawald's record and year after, Ryoyu Kobayashi became the third person to win all four events.

Three nations each have sixteen victories: Austria, Finland and Germany (including nine victories earned by ski jumpers from East Germany, four - from West Germany and three - from unified German team). Fourth is Norway with eleven victories. Poland has five victories, Japan has three victories. Czechoslovakia and one of its successors the Czech Republic have two victories altogether, as have Slovenia. USSR has a single victory.

Overall winners

National quota
During the Four Hills Tournament many national jumpers from Germany and Austria are allowed to qualify for the competition. This allows them to show themselves and get experience. The national jumping team starts first in the qualification.

Notable participants
In 1965, the Polish jumper, Stanisław Marusarz (silver medal in World Championship, 1938 in Lahti) who was visiting the tournament, asked the jury in Garmisch-Partenkirchen to allow him a showcase jump. After a long debate, the jury agreed. Marusarz, who at this time was 53 years old (and not practicing jumping for nine years) achieved 66 meters, using borrowed skies and boots and making his jump in an official suit (in which he attended the New Years Party), which made the crowd applaud.

See also
 Nordic Tournament
Raw Air
Planica7

References

External links
 Four Hills Tournament web site

 
International sports competitions hosted by Germany
International sports competitions hosted by Austria
Ski jumping competitions in Austria
Ski jumping competitions in Germany
1953 establishments in Austria
1953 establishments in West Germany
Recurring sporting events established in 1953
December sporting events
January sporting events
FIS Ski Jumping World Cup